Vernon K. Smith (c. 1913 – May 2, 1966) was a Democratic politician from Idaho. He was the Democratic nominee for Governor of Idaho in 1962. Smith was defeated by the Republican incumbent, Robert E. Smylie.

Smith was noted for his pro-gambling views, and ran on that platform in 1962.

He died at Boise of a heart attack in May 1966. He was 53.

References

1910s births
1966 deaths
Idaho Democrats
Year of birth uncertain